Quinisulcius acutus is a plant pathogenic nematode infecting soybean and sunflower.

See also 
 List of soybean diseases
 List of sunflower diseases

References

External links 
 BioLib.cz
 Quinisulcius acutus

Tylenchida
Nematodes described in 1955
Soybean diseases
Sunflower diseases
Agricultural pest nematodes